Mario Mieruch (born 16 August 1975) is a German politician, elected to the Bundestag in September 2017 as a member of Alternative for Germany. He left the party's parliamentary bloc the following month.

Life 
Mieruch was born in Magdeburg. After compulsory military service, he completed a degree in mechatronics and has worked in industrial automation since 2000.

Political career 
Mieruch was part of Wahlalternative 2013 and then became a founding member of Alternative for Germany. He was elected to the Bundestag on the party list in the September 2017 election. The following month, he followed the party leader Frauke Petry in leaving its parliamentary bloc to become an independent on grounds that it was failing to distance itself from right-wing extremist elements, in particular Björn Höcke.

Personal life 
He lives in Metelen and has been married for twenty years.

References

External links 
 Official biography at Bundestag 

1975 births
Living people
Politicians from Magdeburg
People from Bezirk Magdeburg
Members of the Bundestag for North Rhine-Westphalia
Members of the Bundestag 2017–2021
Members of the Bundestag for the Alternative for Germany